Noureddine Hadid (born 28 January 1993) is a Lebanese sprinter. He represented his country in the 200 metres at the 2019 World Championships in Doha without advancing from the first round but setting a new national record of 20.84.

International competitions

Personal bests
Outdoor
100 metres – 10.41 (+1.4 m/s, Doha 2019) NR
200 metres – 20.83 (-3.3 m/s, Erzurum 2021) NR
400 metres – 47.36 (Jamhour 2019) NR
Indoor
60 metres – 6.74 (ostrava 2020) NR
200 metres – 21.60 (istanbul 2020) NR
400 metres – 49.63 (Hangzhou 2014) NR

References

External links
 https://www.worldathletics.org/athletes/lebanon/noureddin-hadid-332893

1993 births
Living people
Lebanese male sprinters
World Athletics Championships athletes for Lebanon
Athletes (track and field) at the 2018 Asian Games
Asian Games competitors for Lebanon
Athletes (track and field) at the 2020 Summer Olympics
Olympic athletes of Lebanon
20th-century Lebanese people
21st-century Lebanese people